The Bird class is a series of 15 container ships built for NYK Line. The ships have a maximum theoretical capacity of around 14,000 TEU. The ships were built by Japan Marine United at their shipyard in Kure.

List of ships

References 

Container ship classes
Ships built by Japan Marine United